Stewart Edward White (12 March 1873 – September 18, 1946) was an American writer, novelist, and spiritualist. He was a brother of noted mural painter Gilbert White.

Personal life
White was born in Grand Rapids, Michigan, the son of Mary E. (Daniell) and Thomas Stewart White, a lumberman. He attended Grand Rapids High School, and earned degrees from University of Michigan (B.A., 1895; M.A., 1903).

From about 1900 until about 1922 he wrote fiction and non-fiction about adventure and travel, with an emphasis on natural history and outdoor living. Starting in 1922 he and his wife Elizabeth "Betty" Grant White wrote numerous books, that, according to them, were received through channelling with spirits. They also wrote about their travels around the state of California. White died in Hillsborough, California at the age of 73.

Writing
White's books were popular at a time when America was losing its vanishing wilderness. He was a keen observer of the beauties of nature and human nature, yet could render them in a plain-spoken style. Based on his own experience, whether writing camping journals or Westerns, he included pithy and fun details about cabin-building, canoeing, logging, gold-hunting, and guns and fishing and hunting. He also interviewed people who had been involved in the fur trade, the California Gold Rush and other pioneers which provided him with details that give his novels verisimilitude. He salted in humor and sympathy for colorful characters such as canny Indian guides and "greenhorn" campers who carried too much gear. White also illustrated some of his books with his own photographs, while some of his other books were illustrated by artists, such as the American Western painter Fernand Lungren for "The Mountains" and "Camp and Trail". Theodore Roosevelt wrote that White was "the best man with both pistol and rifle who ever shot" at Roosevelt's rifle range at Sagamore Hill.

The Long Rifle (1930), Folded Hills (1932), Ranchero (1933), and Stampede (1942) constitute The Saga of Andy Burnett, which follows a young Pennsylvania farm boy who escapes his overbearing step father by running away to the West with grandmother's blessing and "The Boone Gun", the original Kentucky rifle carried by Daniel Boone. He encounters mountain man Joe Crane, who becomes his mentor in the ways of survival in the wild. The remainder of the saga follows Andy as he moves west, ultimately settling in California, which is the setting of the last three books. The series incorporates actual events and characters from the time period in the narrative. The four stories were published as a posthumous volume, The Saga of Andy Burnett, in 1947, and were adapted into several episodes of The Wonderful World of Disney during 1957 and 1958, starring Jerome Courtland as Andy Burnett, and Jeff York (Mike Fink) as his friend and mentor Joe Crane. This series was in many ways a follow-up to Disney's much more successful Davy Crockett.

Honors
In 1927, the Boy Scouts of America made White an Honorary Scout, a new category of Scout created the same year.  This distinction was given to "American citizens whose achievements in outdoor activity, exploration and worthwhile adventure are of such an exceptional character as to capture the imagination of boys...".  The other eighteen who were awarded this distinction were: Roy Chapman Andrews; Robert Bartlett; Frederick Russell Burnham; Richard E. Byrd; George Kruck Cherrie; James L. Clark; Merian C. Cooper; Lincoln Ellsworth; Louis Agassiz Fuertes; George Bird Grinnell; Charles A. Lindbergh; Donald Baxter MacMillan; Clifford H. Pope; George P. Putnam; Kermit Roosevelt; Carl Rungius; Orville Wright.

Works

 The Westerners (1901)
 The Claim Jumpers (1901)
 The Blazed Trail (1902)
 "Call of the North" (1902)
 The Conjuror's House (1903)
 The Magic Forest: A Modern Fairy Story (1903)
 Blazed Trail Stories (1904)
 The Forest (1904)
 The Mountains (1904)
 The Silent Places (1904)
 The Pass (1906), with S. H. Adams
 The Mystery (1907), with S. H. Adams
 Arizona Nights (1907)
 Camp and Trail (1907)
 The Riverman (1908)
 The Cabin (1910)
 The Adventures of Bobby Orde (1910)
 Rules of the Game (1910) (sequel to The Adventures of Bobby Orde)
 The Sign at Six (1912)
 The Land of Footprints (1912)
 African Camp Fires (1913)
 Gold (1913)
 The Gray Dawn (1915)
 Rediscovered Country (1915)
 Simba (1917)
 The Forty-Niners; A Chronicle of the California Trail and El Dorado (1918)
 The Killer (1919)
 The Rose Dawn (1920)
 Daniel Boone, Wilderness Scout (1922)
 "The Glory Hole" (1924)
 Skookum Chuck (1925)
 Lions in the Path; A Book of Adventure on the High Veldt (1926)
 Back of Beyond (1926)
 Secret Harbour (1926)
 Dog Days, Other Times, Other Dogs; The Autobiography of a Man and His Dog Friends Through Four Decades of Changing America (1930)
 The Long Rifle (1930)
 "The Shepper-Newfounder" (1931)
 Folded Hills (1932)
 Ranchero (1933)
 Pole Star (1935), with Harry DeVighne
 Wild Geese Calling (1940)
 Stampede (1942)

THE PSYCHIC BOOKS:
 Credo (1925)
 Why Be a Mud Turtle (1928)

These first two books are "pre" Betty´s book. White discusses the philosophy of the future books, without revealing the source (the channeling through his wife Betty).

 The Betty Book (1937)
 Across the Unknown (1939), with Harwood White
 The Unobstructed Universe (1940) (Considered the most important of the collection)
 The Road I Know (1942)
 Anchors to Windward (1939)
 The Stars are Still There (1946)
 With Folded Wings (1947)
 The Gaelic Manuscripts

NONFICTION:
 The Birds of Mackinac Island

Filmography 
The Call of the North, directed by Cecil B. DeMille and Oscar Apfel (1914, based on the novel The Conjuror's House)
The Westerners, directed by Edward Sloman (1919, based on the novel The Westerners)
The Leopard Woman, directed by Wesley Ruggles (1920, based on the novel The Leopard Woman)
The Killer, directed by Jack Conway and Howard Hickman (1921, based on the novel The Killer)
The Call of the North, directed by Joseph Henabery (1921, based on the novel The Conjuror's House)
The Gray Dawn (1922, based on the novel The Gray Dawn)
The Two-Gun Man, directed by David Kirkland (1926, based on the novel Two-Gun Man)
Arizona Nights, directed by Lloyd Ingraham (1927, based on a story by Stewart Edward White)
Under a Texas Moon, directed by Michael Curtiz (1930, based on the novel Two-Gun Man)
Part Time Wife, directed by Leo McCarey (1930, based on the story The Shepper-Newfounder)
Mystery Ranch, directed by David Howard (1932, based on the novel The Killer)
Change of Heart, directed by James Tinling (1938, based on the story The Shepper-Newfounder)
Wild Geese Calling, directed by John Brahm (1941, based on the novel Wild Geese Calling)
Walt Disney: Saga of Andy Burnett, directed by Lewis R. Foster (1957–1958, TV miniseries, based on the novel The Long Rifle)

References

Sources
 J. C. Underwood, Literature and Insurgency (New York, 1914)
Staff report (September 19, 1946). STEWART E. WHITE, NOVELIST, IS DEAD; Author of Stories of Adventure and Frontier Life Was 73—Stricken After Fabled Career CHOKED LEOPARD TO DEATH Writer of 'Blazed Trail' Knew Yukon, Africa and West—Honored as Geographer
"Stewart White, Adventurer and novelist, dies; books captured thrills of own exciting life." Chicago Tribune, September 19, 1946

External links

 Stewart Edward White Biography
 Guide to the Stewart Edward White Manuscripts at The Bancroft Library
 
 
 
 
 
 
 

1873 births
1946 deaths
20th-century American novelists
American male non-fiction writers
American male novelists
American spiritual writers
Mediumship
New Age writers
Novelists from Michigan
Organization founders
University of Michigan alumni
Writers from Grand Rapids, Michigan
20th-century American male writers
Members of the American Academy of Arts and Letters